Septimius The Great is an American singer, actor and model. He is a Grammy nominated Artist known for his work predominantly in EDM.

References

American musicians
American actors
American male models
Living people
Year of birth missing (living people)